Resurrection Cemetery is the name of many cemeteries, including around 40 in the United States.  The name may refer to:

Resurrection Cemetery (Madison, Wisconsin) — a Roman Catholic cemetery in Madison, Dane County, Wisconsin, USA, in the Roman Catholic Diocese of Madison
Cemetery of the Resurrection — a Roman Catholic cemetery on Staten Island (Richmond County), New York
Saint Charles Cemetery — a Roman Catholic cemetery also known as "St. Charles/Resurrection Cemeteries" in Farmingdale, Suffolk County, New York, in the Roman Catholic Diocese of Brooklyn